Ohio's 17th senatorial district has long been located in southeastern Ohio and currently consists of the counties of Ross, Fayette, Clinton, Highland, Pike, Jackson and Gallia as well as portions of the counties of Lawrence, Vinton and Pickaway.  It encompasses Ohio House districts 91, 92 and 93.  It has a Cook PVI of R+5.  Its current Ohio Senator is Republican Shane Wilkin.  He resides in Hillsboro, a city located in Highland County.

List of senators

References

External links
Ohio's 17th district senator at the 130th Ohio General Assembly official website

Ohio State Senate districts